Gudrun (minor planet designation: 328 Gudrun) is a main-belt asteroid.

It was discovered by Max Wolf on March 18, 1892, in Heidelberg.

References

External links 
 
 

000328
Discoveries by Max Wolf
Named minor planets
000328
18920318